Callidula nigresce is a moth in the  family Callidulidae. It is found on the Solomon Islands.

References

Callidulidae
Moths described in 1887